The 2011 Monte Carlo Rally, officially 79ème Rallye Automobile de Monte-Carlo was the first round of the 2011 Intercontinental Rally Challenge (IRC) season. The rally took place between January 19–22, 2011. The event marked the centenary of the creation of the Monte Carlo Rally, which was first held on January 21, 1911.

Introduction
The rally started in Valence on Wednesday 19 January and covered over 1341 km including 337 km in thirteen special stages. Stages were run both in daylight and at night and included two passes through the famous Col de Turini on the Friday night. A full capacity 120 entries were registered for the event including Le Mans 24 Hours star Stéphane Sarrazin and WRC brothers Petter and Henning Solberg. This was in addition to the regular IRC participants; Jan Kopecký, Freddy Loix, Bruno Magalhães, Thierry Neuville, Guy Wilks and reigning champion Juho Hänninen.

Eurosport expanded their TV coverage of the event showing twelve of the thirteen stages live as part of a total of fourteen hours of television over the three days of the competition.

Results
Bryan Bouffier won his first and only IRC rally after a tyre gamble on the second day proved fruitful and lifted him from seventh in the rally standings to the lead. He had a commanding lead of 50 seconds into the final day which proved too much for his rivals and led him to victory. Second went to Škoda's Freddy Loix and third place went to Guy Wilks, after Stéphane Sarrazin incurred a 30-second penalty for checking into service three minutes late after the final stage. Sarrazin finished fourth ahead of 1994 rally winner François Delecour, who was making his return to rallying after a lengthy absence.

Overall

Special stages

References

External links 
 The official website for the rally
 The official website of the Intercontinental Rally Challenge

2011
Rally
Monte Carlo Rally
Monte